Hoplunnis similis is an eel in the family Nettastomatidae (duckbill/witch eels). It was described by David G. Smith in 1989. It is a marine, deep water-dwelling eel which is known from the western central Atlantic Ocean, including Florida, USA, Honduras and Nicaragua.

References

Nettastomatidae
Fish described in 1989